Carlini may refer to:

People 
Carlini (surname), Italian surname

Other 
 Andrena carlini, a species of mining bee in the family Andrenidae
 Carlini (crater), a lunar crater
 Carlini Design (1969 - present), American motorcycle and handlebar company
 Carlini Station, Argentinian base in Antarctica (ex-Jubany)
 Lobelia Carlini, a Japanese steampunk media franchise 
 Carlini, plural of carlino, a medieval south Italian coin, see Gigliato

See also

Carlina (name)
 Carlino (disambiguation)